Estella is a northern suburb of Wagga Wagga, New South Wales, Australia. The suburb is relatively new with development commencing in the 1980s, however growth has been slow and land is still being subdivided.

The suburb is located directly to the south of Charles Sturt University, and to the west of Boorooma. The southern and western boundaries of the suburb are Old Narrandera Road and Pine Gully Road respectively.

Streets in Estella are named after crop varieties and individual associated with the Agricultural Research Institute.

In early 2012 the intersection of Avocet Drive and Booroma Street was upgraded to include a dual-lane roundabout. A new road creating further  access to Boorooma was also created.

Other Estella
There are other two inhabited places with the name Estella in the world:
 Estella (Navarre, Spain), the original one.
 Estella (Wisconsin, USA).

References

External links 

Suburbs of Wagga Wagga